Les Mongoles were a militia group active in the Kivu region of Zaire. Principally active between 1997–99, the mongoles were active in opposing the Rally for Congolese Democracy (RCD).

Sources
 Non State Armed Actors: Region and Country Survey International Campaign to Ban Landmines. Feb 2000.

History of the Democratic Republic of the Congo
Rebel groups in the Democratic Republic of the Congo